The Sesquicentennial March is a well-known Peruvian march, composed by the Peruvian composer Jaime Díaz Orihuela (Arequipa, 1927). The march, winner of a national contest for military music in celebration of the sesquicentennial of national independence in 1971, represents a grand combination of Andean sentiment and a pronounced martial theme. It is one of the more popular marches among those performed in parades and ceremonies in Peru.

References

External links

Peruvian music
Peruvian military marches
Military of Peru